The Eckersberg Medal (originally the Akademiets Aarsmedaille or Annual Academy Medal) is an annual award of the Royal Danish Academy of Fine Arts. It is named after Christoffer Wilhelm Eckersberg, known as the father of Danish painting.

The Eckersberg Medal was created in 1883, on the 100th birthday of its namesake.

Eckersberg Medal recipients
Source (1940 onwards): Akademiraadet

1880s

1890s

1900s

1910s

1920s

1930s

1940s

1950s

1960s
1960: Ejler Bille, Sven Havsteen-Mikkelsen, Henry Luckow-Nielsen
1961: Flemming Bergsøe, Jørgen Andersen Nærum
1962: Preben Hornung, Svend Engelund
1963: Anna Klindt Sørensen, Jeppe Vontillius
1964: Albert Mertz, Sig. Vasegaard 
1965: Frede Christoffersen, Reidar Magnus, Erik Thommesen 
1966: Søren Georg Jensen, Poul Bjørklund
1967: Poul Ekelund, Erling Frederiksen, Agnete Varming, Gunnar Westman
1968: Ib Braase, Agnete Bjerre
1969: Kjeld Hansen, Jørgen Haugen Sørensen, Willy Ørskov

1970s
1970: Paul Gadegaard, Erling Jørgensen, Christian Poulsen
1971: Kasper Heiberg, Richard Winther
1972: Johannes Carstensen, Knud Hvidberg, Anna Thommesen (weaving), Sigrid Lütken, Jens-Flemming Sørensen
1973: Helge Bertram, Erik Lynge
1974: Henrik Buch, Rasmus Nellemann, Gert Nielsen
1975: Arne Haugen Sørensen, Egon Fischer
1976: Alfred Madsen, Niels Macholm
1977: Gunnar Aagaard Andersen
1978: Ib Geertsen, Poul Gernes, Jørn Larsen, Tage Stentoft
1979: Henning Damgård-Sørensen, Else Fischer-Hansen, Arne Ungermann, Eva Sørensen

1980s
1980: Emil Gregersen, Niels Guttormsen, Børge Jørgensen, Bjørn Nørgaard
1981: Vera Myhre, Karin Nathorst Westfelt, Knud Munk 
1982: Sven Hauptmann, Anders Kirkegaard, Franka Rasmussen, Anna Maria Lütken, Gudrun Steenberg
1983: Knud Hansen, Søren Kjærsgaard, Mogens Lohmann, Ole Sporring
1984: Mogens Jørgensen, Tonning Rasmussen, Hans Christian Rylander, Kurt Trampedach, Ole Christensen
1985: Seppo Mattinen, Elsa Nielsen, John Olsen, Agnete Therkildsen
1986: Jørgen Rømer, Arne Johannessen, Kirsten Lockenwitz, Ingálvur av Reyni, Hein Heinsen
1987: Nanna Hertoft, Frank Rubin
1988: Leif Lage, Finn Mickelborg, Hanne Varming, Mogens Møller
1989: Freddie A. Lerche, Gudrun Poulsen, Ole Heerup, Eiler Kragh, Peter Bonnén

1990s
 1990: Jørgen Boberg, Helle Thorborg, Thomas Bang
 1991: Jens Birkemose, Stig Brøgger, Torben Ebbesen
 1992: Kai Lindemann, Per Neble
 1993: Ingvar Cronhammar
 1994: Peter Brandes, Otto Lawaetz, Inge Lise Westman, Kirsten Dehlholm
 1995: Merete Barker, Troels Wörsel, Jørgen Roos (film), Kirsten Ortwed
 1996: Erik A. Frandsen, Sys Hindsbo, Bent Karl Jacobsen, Aksel Jensen, Kehnet Nielsen, Lene Adler Petersen, Kirsten Justesen, Thorbjørn Lausten
 1987: Erik Hagens, Karin Birgitte Lund, Eric Andersen, Margrete Sørensen
 1998: Henrik Have, Frithioff Johansen, Jytte Rex, Christian Lemmerz
 1999: Jesper Christiansen, Peter Lautrop, Ane Mette Ruge, Elisabeth Toubro

2000s

2010s

2020s

See also 

List of European art awards

References

External links
Full listing of Eckersberg Medal winners from Akademiraadet

Danish art awards
Architecture awards of Denmark
Awards established in 1883
Royal Danish Academy of Fine Arts
1883 establishments in Denmark